X-ray flash may refer to:

 X-ray flash (astronomy)
 Brief artificial production of X-rays